Mangaluru Junction railway station, formerly Kankanadi railway station (station code: MAJN) is a gateway to the port city of Mangaluru located at Darbar Hill, Padil, Mangaluru, 575007, coming under the Palakkad Division of Southern Railway. The station is a junction interconnecting Mangalore Central railway station with Kerala in the south, Maharashtra/Goa and Mangalore Sea Port in the north and Bengaluru–Chennai in the east. It is the busiest railway junction in the area, as all north- and southbound trains touch Mangalore through this station.

It was formerly called Kankanadi railway station when the city railway station was simply called Mangalore railway station. Later both were renamed as Mangalore Junction and  respectively to avoid confusion.

This is the first station in the Southern Railway zone after the Konkan Railway zone which ends at Thokur, the previous station up north. The railways wish to develop Mangalore Junction to a world-class station on the 60 acres of land, owned by the railways, that adjoins the station.

Service
The railway station has the daily connectivity to important cities of India like – Mumbai, Kochi, New Delhi, Jaipur, Ahmedabad, Bengaluru, Chennai, Thiruvananthapuram .

Thiruvananthapuram Rajdhani Express  connect with Hazrat Nizamuddin railway station in New Delhi along with other trains like Mangala Lakshadweep Express, Kerala Sampark Kranti Express.

Other trains include Tirunelveli–Gandhidham Humsafar Express, Marusagar Express, Kochuveli-Shri Ganganagar Junction Express, Jabalpur-Coimbatore Superfast Express, Kochuveli–Lokmanya Tilak Terminus Garib Rath Express, Netravati Express, Matsyagandha Express

Location
The nearest major transport hubs:
Nearest airport: Mangalore International Airport (11 km)
Nearest sea port: New Mangalore Port (14 km)
Nearest bus stations Hampankatta (6 km) and Lalbagh, Mangalore (8 km)
Nearest bus stops:Naguri (200 mtrs), Padil (500 mtrs), Bajal Cross (100 mtrs)
Distance from Mangalore Central railway station is 6 km

See also
Thokur railway station
Surathkal railway station
Kochuveli railway station
KSR Bengaluru station

References

External links

Transport in Mangalore
Buildings and structures in Mangalore
Railway stations in Dakshina Kannada district
Railway junction stations in Karnataka
Railway stations along Konkan Railway line
Palakkad railway division